The 1978 Iowa State Cyclones football team represented the Iowa State University during the 1978 NCAA Division I-A football season as a member of the Big Eight Conference (Big 8). The team was led by head coach Earle Bruce, in his sixth year, and they played their home games at Cylcone Stadium in Ames, Iowa. They finished the season with a record of eight wins and four losses (8–4, 4–3 Big 8) and with a loss to Texas A&M in the All-American Bowl. Iowa State's secondary coach was Pete Carroll.

Schedule

Roster

Game summaries

Iowa

Nebraska

Hall of Fame Classic

Team players in the 1979 NFL Draft

References

Iowa State
Iowa State Cyclones football seasons
Iowa State Cyclones football